Fayza Ahmed (December 5, 1934 – September 24, 1983) was a Syrian-Egyptian-Lebanese singer and actress. During her career, she appeared in six films.

Early life

Fayza Ahmed was born in 1934 in Damascus to a Syrian father and a Lebanese mother. She had five children and nine grandchildren.

Competition
On singing, Fayza Ahmad emerged at a time when the field was already crowded with formidable competitors. These included;

 Najat Al Saghira (born 1938)
 Warda Al-Jazairia (1939–2012),
 Sabah (singer) (1927–2014), 
 Shadia (1931–2017),
 Fairuz (born 1934), and others.

Death
Fayza Ahmed died in 1983 in Cairo after suffering from cancer.

Selected filmography 
 Tamr Henna (1957) with Naima Akef, Ahmed Ramzy, and Rushdy Abaza.
 Ana wa Banati (1961) with Salah Zulfikar, Zaki Rostom, and Zahrat El-Ola.

References

External links

1934 births
1983 deaths
 Faiza Ahmed
Syrian emigrants to Egypt
Faiza Ahmed
Syrian film actresses
Faiza Ahmed
20th-century Egyptian actresses
20th-century Syrian actresses
20th-century Syrian singers
Egyptian film actresses
20th-century Egyptian women singers